Hat Samran is a district (amphoe) in the southern part of Trang province, Thailand.

History
The minor district (king amphoe) Hat Samran was established on 30 April 1994 by splitting it from Palian district.

In 2007 all 81 minor districts were upgraded to full districts. With publication in the Royal Gazette on 24 August 2007 the upgrade became official.

Administration
The district is divided into three sub-districts (tambons), which are further subdivided into 21 villages (mubans). There are no municipal (thesaban) areas, and three tambon administrative organizations (TAO).

References

External links
amphoe.com

Districts of Trang province